Grandoni is a surname. Notable people with the surname include:

Alessandro Grandoni (born 1977), Italian football coach and former player
Andrea Grandoni (born 1997), Sanmarinese football player